The Player (Spanish: El jugador) is a 1953 Mexican crime film directed by Vicente Oroná and starring David Silva, Carmelita González and Aurora Segura.

Cast

References

Bibliography 
 María Luisa Amador. Cartelera cinematográfica, 1950-1959. UNAM, 1985.

External links 
 

1953 films
1953 crime films
Mexican crime films
1950s Spanish-language films
Films directed by Vicente Oroná
Mexican black-and-white films
1950s Mexican films